Acacia gracilifolia, commonly known as graceful wattle, is a shrub belonging to the genus Acacia and the subgenus Plurinerves native to a small area of central southern Australia.

Description
It has slender, glabrous branchlets with yellow ribbing. It flowers between August and November producing simple inflorescences that occur singly or in groups of two or three in the axils. The flower-heads have a cylindrical to almost spherical shape with bright yellow flowers.

Taxonomy
The species was first formally described by the botanists Joseph Maiden and William Blakely in 1927.
The specific epithet is taken from the Latin words gracilis meaning graceful or slender and folium meaning leaf in reference to the long thin phyllodes.
The shrub is part of the Acacia wilhelmiana group along with nine close relatives: Acacia abrupta, Acacia ascendens, Acacia barattensis, Acacia brachypoda, Acacia cowaniana, Acacia helmsiana, Acacia leptalea, Acacia menzelii and Acacia viscifolia.

Distribution
The shrub is scattered in an area of South Australia in the southern Flinders Ranges and the northern Mount Lofty Ranges from around Wilmington in the north down to around Port Pirie in the south where it is often situated in gorges or on rocky hillsides growing in shallow loamy soils as a part of scrubby Eucalyptus woodland communities.

See also
 List of Acacia species

References

Bibliography

gracilifolia
Flora of South Australia
Plants described in 1927
Taxa named by Joseph Maiden
Taxa named by William Blakely